Bulgasal: Immortal Souls is a South Korean television series starring Lee Jin-wook, Kwon Nara, Lee Joon, Gong Seung-yeon, Jung Jin-young, Park Myung-shin, and Kim Woo-seok. It is led by director Jang Young-woo, and the screenplay is written by husband-and-wife team Kwon So-ra and Seo Jae-won. It aired on tvN from December 18, 2021 to February 6, 2022. It is also available for streaming on Netflix.

Synopsis
The series tells the story of a woman who remembers her past lives by repeating death and reincarnation for 600 years, and a man who cannot kill nor be killed and has lived for the past 600 years as a Bulgasal—a mythical creature that feeds off human blood and is cursed with immortality.

Cast

Main
 Lee Jin-wook as Dan Hwal
 Lee Joo-wan as young Dan Hwal
 A man who used to be a human, but becomes an immortal during the Joseon dynasty while working as a military official and carrying out a task to erase the remnants of the previous dynasty.
 Kwon Nara as Min Sang-woon / Kim Hwa-yeon
 Han Seo-jin  as young Min Sang-woon / Min Sang-yeon
 A woman who used to be an immortal, but goes through a tragic event that turns her into a human.
 Lee Joon as Ok Eul-tae
 Another immortal, commonly known as the "Dark Hole", living in secrecy who enjoys his eternal life, as well as his wealth and power.
 Gong Seung-yeon as Dan Sol / Min Si-ho
 Dan Sol: Dan Hwal's past wife who is the daughter of a powerful family.
 Min Si-ho: Dan Sol's reincarnation who is Min Sang-woon's younger sister.
 Jung Jin-young as Dan Geuk / Kwon Ho-yeol
 Dan Geuk: Dan Sol's father who is a powerful general.
 Kwon Ho-yeol: Dan Geuk's reincarnation who is a former detective.
  as a shaman / Hye-suk
 Shin Soo-yeon as young Hye-suk
 A shaman who lived 600 years ago.
 Hye-suk: the shaman's reincarnation who always helps Dan Hwal.
 Kim Woo-seok as Nam Do-yoon
 A high school student who follows Dan Hwal around like a puppy. He works for Ok Eul-tae. He is later revealed to be the reincarnation of Dan Hwal's son.

Supporting
 Han Dong-kyu as Goo-bong, a resident of a village who lives a rough life due to bulgasal.
 Park Joo-hwan as Dan Ah-chan, Dan Hwal and Dan Sol's son.
 Han Seong-soo as Jo Ma-gu, a ghost with a strong appetite who even devours human corpses.
 Lee Kyu-ho as Du Eok-si-ni
 Oh Yu-jin as Kim Go-bun, Kim Hwa-yeon's younger sister.

Special appearances
 Lee Jin-hee as Sang Un-mo, Min Sang-woon's mother.
 Kim Tae-baek as Kim Sang-hui's husband

Production

Casting
The lead role was first offered to Won Bin, but the actor ultimately refused.

On December 17, 2020, it was reported that Lee Jin-wook was being cast for the series and was positively considering his appearance. The actor and director Jang Young-woo previously worked together in 2020 series Sweet Home. In February 2021, actors Lee Joon, Kwon Nara and Jung Jin-young also received casting offer. Line-up for the lead stars consisting of Lee Jin-wook, Kwon Nara, Lee Joon, Gong Seung-yeon, Jung Jin-young, Park Myung-shin and Kim Woo-seok was finally confirmed on March 17.

Release
Bulgasal: Immortal Souls was initially scheduled for release in 2022. In November 2021, it was confirmed that the series would premiere on December 18.

Original soundtrack

Part 1

Part 2

Part 3

Part 4

Viewership

Notes

References

External links
  
 
 
 

TVN (South Korean TV channel) television dramas
Television series by Studio Dragon
South Korean fantasy television series
South Korean thriller television series
South Korean historical television series
2021 South Korean television series debuts
2022 South Korean television series endings
Korean-language Netflix exclusive international distribution programming